is the second studio album by Swedish singer-songwriter Lars Winnerbäck, released in 1997.

Track listing
"", One of Them All
"", No One Feels Like
"", Someone Else
"", Rush Hour
"", Autumn on My Planet
"", The ballad About Consequences
"", Spring for the Queen of Hearts
"", Psalm in January
"", A Difficult and Tough Thing
"", Low
"", Now Everyone Are Little Stars
"", Friends

Charts

References 

1997 albums
Lars Winnerbäck albums